Mathieu Hermans (born 9 January 1963 in Goirle) is a Dutch former professional road bicycle racer. Mathieu Hermans was the Lanterne rouge of the Tour de France twice, in 1987 and 1989. He won a stage in the 1989 Tour de France. Hermans was more successful in the Vuelta a España, where he won 9 stages in total.

Major results

1981
 1st Overall Grand Prix Rüebliland
1983
 1st Stages 1 & 3 Triptyque Ardennais
1984
 1st Ziklokross Igorre
1985
 1st Stage 4 Vuelta a Castilla y León
 2nd Circuito de Getxo
1986
 1st Stage 3 Tour de Romandie
 2nd Overall Vuelta a Aragón
1st Stages 2 & 7
 8th Overall Vuelta a Andalucía
1987
 1st Paris–Camembert
 1st Stages 1, 2 & 6 Volta a la Comunitat Valenciana
 3rd Trofeo Masferrer
 4th Overall Ronde van Nederland
1st Stage 4
 5th Scheldeprijs
 5th Omloop van het Leiedal
1988
 1st Profronde van Maastricht
 1st Profronde van Oostvoorne
 1st Trofeo Masferrer
 Vuelta a España
1st Stages 3, 5, 6, 9, 15 & 20
 1st GP San Froilan Lugo
 1st GP Albacete
 1st Stage 1, 2a & 2b Setmana Catalana de Ciclisme
 1st Stages 1, 2, 3 & 4 Vuelta a Murcia
 1st Stages 3 & 5 Volta a la Comunitat Valenciana
 1st Stage 1 Volta a Catalunya
 1st Stage 4 Ronde van Nederland
 4th E3-Prijs Harelbeke
1989
 1st Trofeo Luis Puig
 1st Profronde van Pijnacker
 1st Stage 11 Tour de France
Vuelta a España
1st Stages 12, 13 & 18
 1st Stage 1 Tour de Luxembourg
 1st Stage 1 Volta a Catalunya
 3rd Veenendaal–Veenendaal
 3rd Overall Tour de l'Oise
 5th Tour of Flanders
 8th Ronde van Limburg
 9th E3-Prijs Harelbeke
 9th Grand Prix Cerami
1990
 1st Stage 2 Volta a Catalunya
 1st Stage 5 Setmana Catalana de Ciclisme
 1st Stage 6 Volta a la Comunitat Valenciana
1991
 1st Stage 2 Vuelta a Asturias
 1st Stage 5 Setmana Catalana de Ciclisme
1992
 1st Circuito de Getxo
 1st Clasica de Sabiñanigo
 1st Stage 2a Setmana Catalana de Ciclisme
 1st Stage 2 Vuelta a Murcia
 1st Stage 1 Tour of Galicia
 2nd Trofeo Masferrer
1993
 7th Binche–Tournai–Binche

Grand Tour general classification results timeline

References

External links 

Official Tour de France results for Mathieu Hermans

1963 births
Living people
Doping cases in cycling
Dutch male cyclists
Dutch Tour de France stage winners
Dutch Vuelta a España stage winners
Dutch sportspeople in doping cases
People from Goirle
Cyclists from North Brabant
20th-century Dutch people
21st-century Dutch people